Pethampalayam, also known as Peddampalayam, is a panchayat town in Erode district in the Indian state of Tamil Nadu.

Demographics
 India census, Pethampalayam had a population of 7,132. Males constitute 50% of the population and females 50%. Pethampalayam has an average literacy rate of 55%, lower than the national average of 59.5%: male literacy is 60%, and female literacy is 38%. In Pethampalayam, 9% of the population is under 6 years of age.

References

Cities and towns in Erode district